MS-200 or variation, may refer to:

 Club of Four MS200, a medium duty truck
 Handley Page MS/200, a seaplane variant of the biplane Handley Page Type L
 Mirapoint MS200, a mail switch; see Mirapoint Email Appliance
 Morane-Saulnier MS.200, an airplane
 Motorola MS200, a clamshell CDMA cellphone; see List of Motorola products

See also

 Pomonok School & STAR Academy (MS/PS200, Public School 200) in Kew Gardens Hills, Queens, New York City, New York State, USA
 Manuscript 200 (MS 200)
 Stefan Zweig Collection MS 200, a manuscript by Martin Luther
 Harley MS 200, a manuscript in the British Library written by Robert of Avesbury
 Lambeth Palace Library MS 200, see List of illuminated later Anglo-Saxon manuscripts
 
 
 MS 2000 (disambiguation)
 MS20 (disambiguation)
 MS2 (disambiguation)
 MS (disambiguation)
 200 (disambiguation)